William McCranor Henderson (born in 1943 in Charlotte, North Carolina) is an American author whose writing explores the mutual influences of popular culture and literature, and the dark side of celebrity. Boston Magazine noted that his work displays "a real feel for the sad, ridiculous squalor in America, the tacky bars and beauty shops and motel swimming pools, the even cheaper dreams of the people who hang out at them." Henderson, according to The Philadelphia Inquirer, "has raided the pop-cult pantheon and managed the estimable feat of breathing new life into the theme of adulation and emulation in a fame-happy era." Henderson is best known for his novels, Stark Raving Elvis and I Killed Hemingway.

Writing

Stark Raving Elvis, (E.P. Dutton, 1984), was cited by the St. Louis Dispatch as being "the first instance…of a serious rock novel." The Village Voice characterized it as "profoundly concerned with contemporary American culture and its myths." The New York Times called it "funny and revealing," and The Philadelphia Inquirer wrote, "Henderson's writing is nothing if not sure-handed––lean, taut, oddly graceful... There is dark fun to be had in Stark Raving Elvis. This is nifty, aptly titled read." The Boston Herald followed: "Henderson has drawn a rich, comic, crazy picture of pop insanity." And the Houston Chronicle: "Henderson's work is a moral tale."<ref>Review, Tracy Santa, The Houston Chronicle," 1993</ref>  The New York Times named the paperback reissue of Stark Raving Elvis to its April 30, 1987 "New and Noteworthy" List.I Killed Hemingway (Thomas Dunne/St. Martin's, 1993) was published nine years later, again to a positive critical response. "Henderson's novel is as intricate as a Swiss watch. Fortunately, it runs efficiently—with a strong narrative drive, firm delineation of character, and desperate knowledge of how difficult it is for the central character to make sense of his life, to make peace with his shortcomings, and to define himself authentically." Robert Grudin, in The New York Times Book Review, found that Henderson's thematic probing highlighted the very real complexities of literary celebrity, and concluded the work was "complex, amusing and palpably symbolic.". Carl Hiaasen, in The Washington Post, called it "funny, enthralling, and uncommonly clever." The San Francisco Chronicle called it a "raucous tale of literary fear and loathing." Publishers Weekly observed that "Henderson's dementedly comic, ribald foray into fiction and fact may alter forever the way we perceive the delicate art of biography." The Los Angeles Reader noted it was "a genuine rarity: a work of serious fiction that can entertain," and added, "this masterful novel is strongly recommended." I Killed Hemingway was a 1993 New York Times Notable Book of the Year.I Elvis, Confessions of a Counterfeit King (1997), provided a perfect opportunity for Henderson to playfully take on the celebrity mantle himself: it is a nonfiction account of how, when challenged by John Talbot, his editor at Putnam-Berkely, Henderson struggled to teach himself the craft of the Elvis impersonator. He then hit the performance trail to amass first-hand experience for what became, in Kirkus Reviews' words, "a rollicking piece of gonzo journalism." Kirkus also hinted at the author's thematic contribution to American fiction: "Henderson's great achievement is to convey, in elegantly droll prose, what it's like to imagine being a great performer…in the face of real-world evidence to the contrary."

Life

Henderson grew up in Chapel Hill, North Carolina. As a teenager, he was influenced by John Dos Passos' novel The Big Money.Profile: William McCranor Henderson, Contemporary Authors, Gale, 2002 He attended Oberlin College, where he majored in Philosophy. He was accepted to the Iowa Writers' Workshop in poetry, and switched his course to fiction, studying with novelists Nelson Algren and Kurt Vonnegut.Profile: William McCranor Henderson, Contemporary Authors, Gale, 2002 However, he left the program after a year to pursue documentary filmmaking.

Throughout the 60s and 70s, Henderson lived in New York, Los Angeles, and Boston, and had a variety of work experiences as a filmmaker, radio producer, and rock musician. His first novel, Stark Raving Elvis, published in 1983, was loosely based on some of his early experiences as a musician.Profile, Linda Brinson, Winston-Salem Journal, June 6, 1993

In 1989, he returned to Chapel Hill, where he lives with his wife, Carol Henderson. From 1990 to 2002, Henderson served on the Creative Writing faculties of two universities, UNC-Chapel Hill and North Carolina State University, teaching fiction writing to undergraduate and graduate level writers. He has two adult daughters, Olivia and Colette, and two grandchildren, Lucien and Julianne.

Bibliography

 Stark Raving Elvis (1984)
 I Killed Hemingway (1993)
 I, Elvis: Confessions of a Counterfeit King'' (1997)

References

External links
Henderson's website, "a.k.a. William McCranor Henderson"
Henderson's personal blog

1943 births
Living people
Oberlin College alumni
20th-century American novelists
American male novelists
People from Chapel Hill, North Carolina
20th-century American male writers